Walter Ernest Wearne (2 September 186717 January 1931) was an Australian politician and member of the New South Wales Legislative Assembly from 1917 until 1930. He was initially elected as an Independent but subsequently formed the Progressive Party of which he was the leader until it split into urban and rural wings in 1921. His urban wing subsequently amalgamated with the Nationalist Party of which he was the deputy leader in the NSW Parliament.

Early life
Wearne was born in Sydney. He was subsequently educated to elementary level in Bingara and Inverell . His father, James Wearne, owned a sawmill where he was first employed. Wearne also worked as an auctioneer, commercial agent and council clerk for Bingara Shire between 1890 and 1910. By 1920 he had amassed considerable property in the Bingara region.

Political activity
In the first two decades of the twentieth century, he became politically active supporting temperance organizations and the New England New State Movement of Earle Page. He became an office holder of the Farmers and Settlers Association.

State Parliament
At the 1917 election he successfully contested the seat of Namoi as an Independent Nationalist. He defeated the sitting member George Black who had been expelled from the Labor Party for supporting the Nationalist government of William Holman.

Progressive Party and Government
Holman's conservative 'win the war' coalition broke up prior to the 1920 election which was conducted, for the first time, using proportional representation and multi-member seats. Wearne was elected to the three member seat of Namoi and became the leader of the 15 members who had been elected as Progressives. The Progressive Party was characterized by friction between its rural and urban members and this friction came to a climax with the fall of the government of James Dooley on 20 December 1921. Urban progressives favoured a coalition with the Nationalist Party leader George Fuller but most of the rural members, who became known as  'the True Blues', would only promise Fuller their conditional support. This division resulted in Fuller's government lasting less than 8 hours and Dooley regaining the Premiership. Despite representing a rural electorate Wearne sided with T J Ley and the urban wing of the party. This wing subsequently amalgamated with the Nationalist party, of which Wearne became deputy leader, while the rural wing evolved into the Country Party. Wearne continued to represent Namoi as a Nationalist in the Legislative Assembly until multi-member seats were abolished at the 1927 election. He then represented Barwon until his retirement at the 1930 election. Wearne was Secretary for Lands and Minister for Forests in both Fuller Ministries.

References

 

1867 births
1931 deaths
Nationalist Party of Australia members of the Parliament of New South Wales
Members of the New South Wales Legislative Assembly